Dragon Rapide is a 1986 Spanish historical drama film directed, written and produced by Jaime Camino, and starring Juan Diego, Vicky Peña and Manuel de Blas. It is composed by Xavier Montsalvatge. It is about the Spanish Civil War.

Cast

References

External links
 

Spanish historical drama films
1980s historical drama films
Films directed by Jaime Camino
Films scored by Xavier Montsalvatge
Spanish Civil War films
Films set in the Canary Islands
Films shot in Barcelona
1986 in Spain
Drama films based on actual events
Political films based on actual events
War films based on actual events
1986 drama films
1986 films